The Three Evils is a political slogan of the People's Republic of China defined as terrorism, separatism (or "splittism") and religious extremism. The phrase refers to declared counter-terrorism operations undertaken by China, Central Asian republics, and Russia, primarily as related to Xinjiang. The Chinese government views each of the Three Evils as interrelated phenomena driving persistent instability in the westernmost province of Xinjiang, and the slogan has been deployed extensively in support of Xinjiang internment camps since 2017.

History 

Xinjiang is the westernmost province of China and the historical home of the Uyghur people, who speak a language unrelated to Chinese and predominantly practice Islam. The region has been the site of significant tensions under Chinese rule, and attempted to declare independence first as the short-lived First and Second East Turkestan Republics in 1933 and 1944, respectively, ultimately being occupied by the People's Liberation Army in 1949.

China first seriously faced issues of ethnic violence in Xinjiang beginning in the 1990s, such as with the 1990 Baren Township riot, though such incidents were generally classified as "social unrest" until after the September 11 attacks, when the government began to refer to them more in terms of terrorism. Much of the Uyghur discontent stemmed from economic inequality between Uyghurs and Han Chinese migrants, suppression of Uyghur religious practices, and state preference for Han over Uyghur culture, among other issues. Counterterrorism became a much larger Chinese government priority overall after the ascension of Xi Jinping in 2012; following a lull from 2001-2007, militant and terrorist activity had increased notably.

Criticisms 

Human Rights Watch has criticized counter-terrorism cooperation by members of the Shanghai Cooperation Organisation in targeting the three evils, accusing the members' governments of violating international laws regarding human rights. Holly Cartner, Europe and Central Asia director at Human Rights Watch, said, "For many years SCO governments have been criticized for their poor human rights records. The SCO's policies could worsen human rights conditions and seek to justify abuse. It's therefore imperative that the European Union and the United States place even greater emphasis on human rights issues in the region."

See also
Terrorism and counter-terrorism in Kazakhstan
Human rights in Kazakhstan
Terrorism in China
Politics of China

References

External links
Country Reports on Human Rights Practices  - 2005 Released by the Bureau of Democracy, Human Rights, and Labor March 8, 2006
Confronting Terrorism and Other Evils in China: All Quiet on the Western Front?
China/Kazakhstan: Forces hold first-ever joint terrorism exercises
China and Russia embrace the Shanghai spirit
Central Asia: Uyghurs hit by autocratic states' cooperation with Beijing

Counterterrorism
Terrorism in Central Asia
Terrorism in China
Terrorism in Russia
Terrorism in Pakistan